Asad Shareef (born 3 April 1964) is a Maldivian film actor and politician.

Career

1982–2003: Acting career
Shareef made his career debut with the film Beykaaru. The film censorship process was completed on the night of scheduled date for theatrical release. During the screening of the film, it had to be abruptly stopped as the length of the film exceeds the permitted duration of theatrical screening which led to a fuss in the cinema.

Ahmed Nimal-directed drama film Shakku was released in 1988, in which Shareef starred alongside Nimal and Fathimath Rameeza as generous friend wrongly accused of cheating. He also starred in Hamid Ali's Dhefirin opposite Hassan Afeef and Jamsheedha Ahmed, which was primarily shot in Sri Lanka. The following year, he collaborated with Abdul Faththaah for his another romantic drama series, Aisha, where he played the second husband of a woman who walks out of an abusive marriage.

In 2001, Shareef received critical acclaim for his role in Aishath Ali Manik's Hiiy Edhenee (2001) which was an unofficial remake of Dharmesh Darshan's romantic film Dhadkan (2000). Cast opposite Sheela Najeeb and Ali Seezan, he reprised the role played by Suniel Shetty in the original. This was followed by another successful film, Ahmed Nimal-sirected Hilihilaa (2001) featuring alongside Niuma Mohamed and Mariyam Nazima playing the character of married man who is haunted by his previous affair.

One of the most successful films from his career, Fathimath Nahula's romantic film Kalaayaanulaa was released in 2003 which follows a happily married couple (played by Yoosuf Shafeeu and Aishath Shirani) where the husband decided to marry his childhood best friend (played by Niuma Mohamed) when his wife fails to sexually please him. The film received widespread critical acclaim and was declared to be year's highest grossing Maldivian film release. The same year, he played the lead role in Imad Ismail-directed horror film Araamagu Dhonkamana (2003), co-starring Mariyam Shazna and Mariyam Nazima. The film narrates the story of a woman spirit who rises from the sea and marries a toddy extractor, disguised as a human being.

2004–present: Political career
After announcing retirement from acting, Shareef was more involved in politics. He contested as an individual contestant in the Maldives Media Council election and was selected as one of the council members. He also chairs the law committee of the council. He is also a council member of the political party Progressive Party of Maldives.

Filmography

Feature film

Television

Short film

References 

Maldivian male film actors
1964 births
Living people
Dhivehi Rayyithunge Party politicians